Color of Her Eyes is a 1990 EP by the Gear Daddies. The song Color of Her Eyes is also on their full-length album Billy's Live Bait.

Track listing
Color of Her Eyes 
Color of Her Eyes (Acoustic) 
The Tide Is High (a cover of Deborah Harry)
My Maria Color 
Party Stomp

1990 EPs
Gear Daddies albums